The 2018 Asian Men's Volleyball Cup, so-called 2018 AVC Cup for Men was the sixth edition of the Asian Men's Volleyball Cup, a biennial international volleyball tournament organised by the Asian Volleyball Confederation (AVC) with Chinese Taipei Volleyball Association (CTVA). The tournament was held at University of Taipei Gymnasium, Taipei, Taiwan (referred to as Chinese Taipei by the AVC) from 8 to 15 August 2018.

As hosts, Chinese Taipei automatically participated for the tournament, while the remaining 8 teams, qualified from the 2017 Asian Men's Volleyball Championship in Gresik, Indonesia.

Qualification

The 10 AVC member associations qualified for the 2018 Asian Cup. Chinese Taipei qualified as hosts and the 9 remaining teams qualified from the 2017 Asian Championship. But, China later withdrew. The 9 AVC member associations were from five zonal associations, including, Central Asia (2 teams), East Asia (3 teams), Oceania (1 team), Southeast Asia (2 teams) and West Asia (1 team).

Qualified teams
The following teams qualified for the tournament.

Pools composition
This was the first Asian Cup which used the new competition format. Following the 2017 AVC Board of Administration’s unanimous decision, the new format saw teams were drawn into three pools up to the total amount of the participating teams. Each team as well as the hosts was assigned into a pool according to their final standing of the 2017 Asian Championship. As the three best ranked teams were drawn in the same pool A, the next best three contested pool B, the next best three contested pool C. Final standing of the 2017 Asian Championship are shown in brackets.

Venue
 University of Taipei Gymnasium, Taipei, Taiwan

Pool standing procedure
 Number of matches won
 Match points
 Sets ratio
 Points ratio
 If the tie continues as per the point ratio between two teams, the priority will be given to the team which won the last match between them. When the tie in points ratio is between three or more teams, a new classification of these teams in the terms of points 1, 2 and 3 will be made taking into consideration only the matches in which they were opposed to each other.

Match won 3–0 or 3–1: 3 match points for the winner, 0 match points for the loser
Match won 3–2: 2 match points for the winner, 1 match point for the loser

Preliminary round
All times are National Standard Time (UTC+08:00).

Pool A

|}

|}

Pool B

|}

|}

Pool C

|}

|}

Final round
All times are National Standard Time (UTC+08:00).

Playoff

|}

5th–9th quarterfinals

|}

Quarterfinals

|}

5th–8th semifinals

|}

Semifinals

|}

7th place match

|}

5th place match

|}

3rd place match

|}

Final

|}

Final standing

Awards

Most Valuable Player
 Mohamed Ibrahim
Best Setter
 Javad Karimi
Best Outside Spikers
 Renan Ribeiro
 Liu Hung-min

Best Middle Blockers
 Mohamed Ibrahim
 Rahman Taghizadeh
Best Opposite Spiker
 Mubarak Hammad
Best Libero
 Tomohiro Ogawa

See also
2018 Asian Women's Volleyball Cup
2018 Asian Men's Volleyball Challenge Cup
List of sporting events in Taiwan

References

External links
Official website
Squads

2018
Asian Cup
Asian Cup, Men
2018 in Taiwanese sport
August 2018 sports events in Asia